The prime minister of the Hellenic Republic, colloquially referred to as the prime minister of Greece, is the head of government of the Hellenic Republic and the leader of the Greek Cabinet. The incumbent prime minister is Kyriakos Mitsotakis, who took office on 8 July 2019 from Alexis Tsipras.

The officeholder's official seat (but not residence) is the Maximos Mansion in the centre of Athens. The office is described in the Constitution either as Prime Minister or President of the Government (Πρόεδρος της Κυβερνήσεως). This is the reason why the prime minister is also addressed as "Mr/Madam President".

Election and appointment of the prime minister 

The prime minister is officially appointed by the president of Greece.

According to Article 37 of the Greek Constitution, the president of the Hellenic Republic shall appoint the leader of the political party with the absolute majority  of seats in the parliament as prime minister. If no party has the absolute majority, the president shall give the leader of the party with a relative majority (plurality) an exploratory mandate in order to ascertain the possibility of forming a government enjoying the confidence of parliament.

If this possibility cannot be ascertained, the president shall give the exploratory mandate to the leader of the second largest party in Parliament, and if this proves to be unsuccessful, to the leader of the third largest party in parliament. Each exploratory mandate shall be in force for three days.

If all exploratory mandates prove to be unsuccessful, the president summons all party leaders, and if the impossibility to form a cabinet enjoying the confidence of the parliament is confirmed, the president shall attempt to form a cabinet composed of all parties in parliament for the purpose of holding parliamentary elections. If this fails, the president shall entrust the president of the Supreme Administrative Court or of the Supreme Civil and Criminal Court or of the Court of Auditors to form a cabinet as widely accepted as possible to carry out elections after the president dissolves Parliament.

Therefore, the election of members of a certain party to parliament is the equivalent to a vote for that party's leader for prime minister.

Oath of office

Religious oath of office
Before taking office, the prime minister is sworn in at a religious ceremony inside the Presidential Mansion. Prime ministers are sworn in by the archbishop of Athens who is the head of the Church of Greece. The archbishop begins with a few prayers and the Kyrie Eleison, and then the prime minister-elect places his hand on the Bible placed in between two lit candles, all on a table between him and the archbishop. Following after the archbishop, the prime minister-elect then recites the oath:

The archbishop then recites a few more blessings, and the participants make the sign of the cross three times. The archbishop then congratulates the new prime minister, who then shakes hands with the president before the pertinent documents are signed.

Civil oath of office
In 2015 Alexis Tsipras, a self-proclaimed atheist, became the first prime minister to opt for a secular affirmation instead of the traditional religious oath. He was sworn in by President Karolos Papoulias instead of the archbishop of Athens, and, in place of the above oath, recited the affirmation:

He then shook hands with the president, who congratulated him, before proceeding to sign the official documents as normal.

When Tsipras assumed the premiership again, on 21 September 2015, President Prokopis Pavlopoulos decided that the affirmation had to be more formal, as it follows:

Official seat of the prime minister 

The Maximos Mansion (Greek: Μέγαρο Μαξίμου) has been the official seat of the prime minister of Greece since 1982. It is located in central Athens, near Syntagma Square. Although the building contains the offices of the head of the Greek Government, it is not used as the residence of the prime minister.

History of the office

During the revolution (1821–1832)
During the Greek War of Independence, different regions of Greece that were free of Ottoman control began establishing democratic systems for self-government, such as the Peloponnesian Senate. Meanwhile, a series of overarching National Assemblies, such as the First National Assembly at Epidaurus, met from time-to-time to provide overall coordination. The First Assembly elected a 5-member executive council, which was headed by Alexandros Mavrokordatos.

The Executive continued to govern Greece until 1828, when Ioannis Kapodistrias assumed the governance of the state as "Governor of Greece"—simultaneously head of state and of the government. Kapodistrias was assassinated in 1831 and his government, presided over by his brother Augustinos, collapsed the following year. It was replaced by a series of collective governmental councils, which lasted until 1833, when Greece became a monarchy.

Under Otto's absolute monarchy (1832–1843)
In 1832, Greece's nascent experiment with democracy was ended and a monarchy was established with the underage Bavarian Prince Otto as king. Initially the government was led by a regency council made up of Bavarians. The president of this council, Count Josef Ludwig von Armansperg was the de facto head of government under Otto. Later Otto dismissed his Bavarian advisers and wielded power as an absolute monarch, effectively as head of state and his own head of government.

Constitutional monarchy (1843–1910)

King Otto's reign as an absolute monarch came to an end when agitators for a constitution (as had been promised when the monarchy was established) rose up in the 3 September Revolution in 1843. Otto was forced to grant a constitution and Andreas Metaxas took power; he is credited with being the first Greek to formally serve as "Prime Minister."

Once the office of prime minister was established, the responsibility for self-government again fell to the Greek people. However, two factors maintained significant power for the crown: the Greek party structure was weak and client-based and the monarch was free to select any member of parliament to form a government.

In 1862, Otto was finally deposed and the Greek people chose a new monarch in the person of King George I of Greece. In the next 15 years, the party structures began to evolve into more modern ideological parties with the Nationalist Party led by Alexandros Koumoundouros on the right and the more liberal New Party led by Charilaos Trikoupis. Trikoupis was successful after the election of 1874 in forcing the king to accept the "dedilomeni principle"--that the leader of the majority in parliament must be selected as prime minister by the king.

The Nationalists were later led by Theodoros Deligiannis who famously said "was against everything Trikoupis was for."  This two-party system existed until 1910, even as Georgios Theotokis took over the New Party after the death of Trikoupis in 1895 and the assassination of Deligiannis in 1905 which led to a splintering of parties on the conservative and nationalist side.

Upheaval, revolts and war (1910–1946)
In 1910, military officers sparked the fall of civilian government when they issued the Goudi Pronunciamento. This event led to the arrival in Greece of the Cretan politician Eleftherios Venizelos. His followers gathered in the Liberal Party, which, despite Venizelos' dominant status, constituted the first true party in the modern sense, in that it was formed around a progressive, liberal and pro-republican political agenda.

The Liberal Party was eventually opposed by the more conservative and pro-royalist People's Party, initially led by Dimitrios Gounaris. The antagonism between the two parties, and the supporters of monarchy and republicanism, would dominate the political landscape until after the Second World War.

See also 
List of prime ministers of Greece
Politics of Greece

References

External links
Official site of the Greek Prime Minister

Politics of Greece
 
1822 establishments in Greece